Lovejoy is a city in Clayton County, Georgia,  United States. As of the 2010 census, the city had a population of 6,422, up from 2,495 in 2000. During the American Civil War, it was the site of the Battle of Lovejoy's Station during the Atlanta Campaign of 1864.

Lovejoy is proposed by the Georgia Department of Transportation and MARTA to be the endpoint of metro Atlanta's first commuter rail line.

History
Around 1850, the location just north of Fosterville, GA, was positioned along the new railway from Atlanta to Macon. The trainstop there was named for a prosperous local planter, James Lankford Lovejoy. On early maps, the location is called "Lovejoys." It became known as Lovejoy's Station by 1864, where it was the setting of a civil war battle during Sherman's campaign through Georgia. James Lovejoy left the region and died in Clinch County, Georgia in 1877.

The Georgia General Assembly incorporated Lovejoy as a town in 1891.

In 1979, Betty Talmadge, former first-lady of Georgia, purchased the remnants of the Hollywood set "Tara," the fictional plantation featured in Gone With the Wind, and brought them to Lovejoy. The main road through Lovejoy today is named "Tara Blvd." The remnants of Tara are available to be toured at the Lovejoy Plantation through www.savingtara.com.

Geography

Lovejoy is located in southern Clayton County at  (33.444164, -84.315105). It is bordered by Henry County to the south and the unincorporated community of Bonanza to the north. U.S. Routes 19 and 41 pass through the western part of Lovejoy, leading north  to downtown Atlanta and south  to Griffin.

Demographics

2020 census

As of the 2020 United States census, there were 10,122 people, 1,756 households, and 1,272 families residing in the city.

2000 census
As of the census of 2000, there were 2,495 people, 491 households, and 369 families residing in the city. The racial makeup of the city was 64.09% White, 33.51% African American, 0.36% Native American, 0.60% Asian, 0.12% Pacific Islander, 0.60% from other races, and 0.72% from two or more races. Hispanic or Latino of any race were 2.44% of the population.

There were 491 households, out of which 41.5% had children under the age of 18 living with them, 50.7% were married couples living together, 19.1% had a female householder with no husband present, and 24.8% were non-families. 18.9% of all households were made up of individuals, and 3.9% had someone living alone who was 65 years of age or older.  The average household size was 2.66 and the average family size was 2.99.

In the city, the population was spread out, with 17.2% under the age of 18, 19.2% from 18 to 24, 45.0% from 25 to 44, 14.9% from 45 to 64, and 3.7% who were 65 years of age or older.  The median age was 30 years. For every 100 females, there were 265.3 males.  For every 100 females age 18 and over, there were 314.9 males.

The median income for a household in the city was $40,139, and the median income for a family was $40,268. Males had a median income of $21,964 versus $23,229 for females. The per capita income for the city was $14,642.  About 6.1% of families and 11.8% of the population were below the poverty line, including 13.8% of those under age 18 and 2.8% of those age 65 or over.

Education
Clayton County Public Schools operates public schools. The schools in this area are: Lovejoy Middle School and Lovejoy High School.

In 1989, professional wrestler Jody Hamilton opened a school and training facility in Lovejoy. It was later moved to Atlanta and operated as the WCW Power Plant until 2001.

Infrastructure

Transit systems
MARTA serves the city. A planned commuter rail service is expected to terminate in the city.

Notable persons
Kokomo Arnold, Blues Singer and Guitarist
Jocasta Odom, Reality TV show personality and Minister
Preston Williams, NFL Wide Receiver

References

External links
City of Lovejoy official website
Cavalry Action at Lovejoy's Station historical marker
Georgia Militia at Lovejoy's Station historical marker

Cities in Georgia (U.S. state)
Cities in Clayton County, Georgia